Defending champion Daniel Nestor and his partner Max Mirnyi defeated Mariusz Fyrstenberg and Marcin Matkowski in the final, 7–5, 6–3 to win the doubles tennis title at the 2011 ATP World Tour Finals.

Nestor and Nenad Zimonjić were the reigning champions, but they split in 2011. Zimonjić partnered Michaël Llodra, but they were eliminated in the round-robin stage.

Seeds

Draw

Finals

Group A
Standings are determined by: 1. number of wins; 2. number of matches; 3. in two-players-ties, head-to-head records; 4. in three-players-ties, percentage of sets won, or of games won; 5. steering-committee decision.

Group B
Standings are determined by: 1. number of wins; 2. number of matches; 3. in two-players-ties, head-to-head records; 4. in three-players-ties, percentage of sets won, or of games won; 5. steering-committee decision.

External links
Main Draw
Scores

Doubles